Juniperus saltillensis is a species of conifer in the family Cupressaceae.

The shrub or bushy tree is endemic to northern Mexico, in the states of Chihuahua, Coahuila, Nuevo León, and Zacatecas.

It is sometimes an understorey shrub in pinyon–juniper woodland, or open Madrean pine-oak woodlands or oak woodlands forests. It is found at elevations of

See also
 Sierra Madre Occidental pine-oak forests

References

 Current IUCN Red List of all Threatened Species

saltillensis
Endemic flora of Mexico
Trees of Chihuahua (state)
Trees of Coahuila
Trees of Nuevo León
Trees of Zacatecas
Flora of the Mexican Plateau
Flora of the Sierra Madre Occidental
Endangered biota of Mexico
Endangered flora of North America
Taxonomy articles created by Polbot